Antoine "Tonino" Baliardo is a French guitarist of Spanish Gitano descent. 
He is the lead guitarist for Gipsy Kings, a New Flamenco group from France that has sold more than 18 million albums worldwide.  He was born in Montpellier. He is the nephew of guitarist Manitas de Plata.

"Tonino is the most creative person in the band,"  said Chico Bouchikhi, a former member who co-wrote their biggest hit to date, "Bamboléo". "He has lots of ideas and a great imagination. He used to go to school with his guitar."

Baliardo, like his bandmate Nicolas Reyes, does not read or write musical notation.

Solo discography

 Essences (2001)
 Tonino Baliardo (2003)

See also
New Flamenco
Flamenco rumba
Gipsy Kings
Johannes Linstead

References

External links 
 
 

Flamenco guitarists
Gipsy Kings members
Living people
Year of birth missing (living people)
Musicians from Montpellier
Romani guitarists
French Romani people